ATRC may refer to:
 Advanced Test Reactor Critical, a nuclear reactor
 Adaptive Technology Resource Centre, a research group